The Whitten Block is a historic five-story building in Spokane, Washington. It was designed by architect Lorenzo M. Boardman, and built in 1890 for investor Leydford B. Whitten at a cost of $40,000. Tenants included a dry goods store, a flower shop, a shoe repair store, a candy store as well as clothing stores.

In the 1990s the Whitten building and adjacent Miller building were renovated to be the Hotel Lusso. The building once was the location of Louis Davenport's restaurant before the construction of his hotel and currently as part of the Hotel Lusso, is part of The Davenport Hotel Collection. The Whitten Block was listed on the National Register of Historic Places on May 14, 1993.

References

National Register of Historic Places in Spokane County, Washington
Romanesque Revival architecture in Washington (state)
Buildings and structures completed in 1890